The Big Shot is a 1931 American pre-Code comedy film directed by Ralph Murphy and Edward Sedgwick and written by Earl Baldwin, Hal Conklin, George Dromgold and Joseph Fields. The film stars Eddie Quillan, Maureen O'Sullivan, Mary Nolan, Roscoe Ates and Belle Bennett. It was released on December 18, 1931 by RKO Pictures.

Plot
A rash go-getter is duped by would-be swindlers into buying swamp land that turns out to be worth a fortune.

Cast
 Eddie Quillan as Ray Smith
 Maureen O'Sullivan as Doris Thompson
 Mary Nolan as Fay Turner
 Roscoe Ates as Rusty, the Barber
 Belle Bennett as Mrs. Isabel Thompson
 Arthur Stone as Old Timer
 Louis John Bartels as Mr. Howell
 Otis Harlan as Doctor Peaslee
 William Eugene as Jack Spencer
 Edward McWade as Uncle Ira
 Harvey Clark as Mr. Hartman

References

External links
 
 The Big Shot at the TCM Movie Database
 

1931 comedy films
1931 films
American black-and-white films
American comedy films
1930s English-language films
Films directed by Ralph Murphy
Films directed by Edward Sedgwick
RKO Pictures films
Films scored by Arthur Lange
1930s American films